Fiammetta Modena (born 20 June 1965) is an Italian politician from Forza Italia. She is a member of the Italian Senate.

References 

Living people
1965 births
Forza Italia (2013) senators
20th-century Italian lawyers
21st-century Italian lawyers
University of Perugia alumni
Senators of Legislature XVIII of Italy
20th-century Italian politicians
20th-century Italian women politicians
21st-century Italian politicians
21st-century Italian women politicians
People from Perugia
Women members of the Senate of the Republic (Italy)